Aero-Service may refer to:

Aéro-Service and airline based in the Republic of the Congo
Aero-Service Jacek Skopiński, a Polish aircraft manufacturer